William "Willie" Miranda Marín  (September 23, 1940 – June 4, 2010) was the mayor of Caguas, Puerto Rico, from 1997 until his death in 2010.

Personal life
The son of José Miranda Gómez, a sugar cane cutter, and Rafaela Marín, a tobacco stripper, Miranda Marín was born in the Tomás de Castro sector of rural Caguas. and graduated from the José Gautier Benítez High School in Caguas in 1957. Four years later, he earned a bachelor's degree in Accounting from the University of Puerto Rico at Río Piedras. In 1969 he completed his Juris Doctor at the University of Puerto Rico School of Law and was admitted to the bar in 1970.

Miranda Marín and his wife had three children: William Edgardo, Luis Alexander, and José Juan. They resided in the sector of Bairoa in Caguas.

Businessman
Miranda Marín held top positions at Empresas Díaz and the San Juan Cement Co. from 1979 to 1990, among them treasurer, executive vice-president, and co-chairman of the board. Before seeking public office for the first time in 1996, he devoted three years to housing and commercial development. Miranda Marín also served as member and treasurer of the board of the Puerto Rico Health Services Corp., as chairman of the board of the San Juan Children's Choir, and as chairman of the board of the Community Services Institute.

Political career and public service
He served as executive vice president of the Government Development Bank from 1973 to 1975, as executive director of the Puerto Rico Electric Power Authority from 1975 to 1976, and he also served as executive director of the Office for Improvement of the Public Schools of Puerto Rico from 1990 to 1992.

Miranda Marín also was the chairman of the U.S. Democratic Party Chapter of Puerto Rico, secretary-general of the Popular Democratic Party of Puerto Rico (PPD), chairman of the PPD Status Commission, and president of the Puerto Rico Mayors Association. Until his death, he was chairman of the board of the Municipal Revenue Collections Center (CRIM by its acronym in Spanish).
His candidacy had been considered by the Popular Democratic Party (PPD by its acronym in Spanish) to be a viable contender for the Governorship of Puerto Rico.

Military career
William Miranda Marín served for 36 years in the Puerto Rico National Guard starting as Private E-1 enlisted citizen-soldier in 1959 until his retirement in 1993 as the Adjutant General of the Puerto Rico National Guard with the rank of Major General (1990–1992).  While commanding the Puerto Rico National Guard, MG William Miranda Marín founded the PRNG Institutional Trust (FIGNA). Attended the United States Army War College at Carlisle Barracks in Carlisle, Pennsylvania. Miranda Marín retired from the Puerto Rico Army National Guard in 1993.

Military awards

Political Views 
Miranda Marín's views were regarded as soberanista, which seeks more sovereign political powers from the US outside the current framework of E.L.A. (Estado Libre Asociado).

Mayor of Caguas
On January 13, 1997 Miranda Marín became the mayor of Caguas and had since won re-election in  2000, 2004 and 2008.

Death
On September 18, 2009, Miranda Marín announced that he had been diagnosed with pancreatic cancer. On June 4, 2010, at 7:45 in the morning, Miranda Marín died in the Auxilio Mutuo Hospital in Hato Rey, Puerto Rico, after battling his illness. He was cremated, and his ashes were placed at Jardín Botánico y Cultural William Miranda Marín in Caguas, Puerto Rico.

Legacy
The building of the institutional trust of the National Guard of Puerto Rico on State Road #1 from Caguas to Río Piedras at the former facilities of Euro Bank, was posthumously named General William Miranda Marín.

See also

List of Puerto Ricans
List of Puerto Rican military personnel
Puerto Rico Adjutant General

Notes

References

1940 births
2010 deaths
Deaths from pancreatic cancer
Deaths from cancer in Puerto Rico
Mayors of places in Puerto Rico
National Guard (United States) generals
People from Caguas, Puerto Rico
Popular Democratic Party (Puerto Rico) politicians
Puerto Rican Army personnel
Puerto Rican businesspeople
Puerto Rican military officers
Puerto Rican Roman Catholics
Puerto Rico Adjutant Generals
Puerto Rico National Guard personnel
Recipients of the Meritorious Service Medal (United States)
United States Army War College alumni